Unaccompanied Sonata and Other Stories (1980) is a collection of short stories by American writer Orson Scott Card. Although not purely science fiction and definitely not hard science fiction, the book contains stories that have a futuristic angle or are purely works of fantasy set in current times. All the stories except “The Porcelain Salamander” were first published elsewhere before appearing in the Unaccompanied Sonata collection. All eleven of these stories were later published in Maps in a Mirror.

Story list 
The short stories in this book are:

 "Ender’s Game"
 "Kingsmeat"
 "Deep Breathing Exercises"
 "Closing the Timelid"
 "I Put My Blue Genes On"
 "Eumenides in the Fourth Floor Lavatory"
 "Mortal Gods"
 "Quietus"
 "The Monkeys Thought 'Twas All in Fun"
 "The Porcelain Salamander"
 "Unaccompanied Sonata"

See also
List of works by Orson Scott Card
Orson Scott Card

External links
 Publication information for Unaccompanied Sonata available from Card’s website

1980 short story collections
Short story collections by Orson Scott Card
Science fiction short story collections
Fantasy short story collections